Eric of Denmark – Danish: Erik - may refer to:
Eric I of Denmark
Eric II of Denmark
Eric III of Denmark
Eric IV of Denmark
Eric V of Denmark
Eric VI of Denmark
Eric VII of Denmark, better known as Eric of Pomerania
Eric Longbone, Lord of Langeland
Eric Christoffersen of Denmark
Eric I, Duke of Schleswig
Eric II, Duke of Schleswig
Count Erik of Rosenborg